The 1898 Wyoming gubernatorial election was held on November 8, 1898. Incumbent Republican Governor William A. Richards was a candidate for re-election, but he was defeated for renomination at the Republican convention, which instead nominated DeForest Richards. The Democratic Party joined forces with the Free Silver Republicans to jointly nominate former State Representative Horace C. Alger for Governor. The Populist Party, though reduced in influence from earlier elections, nominated E. B. Viall as its candidate. Though the election was closer than 1894, owing in large part to a dramatic reduction in the share of vote received by the Populist nominee, Roberts defeated Alger by a wide margin.

Party conventions
Governor Richards announced that he would seek re-election, and prior to the Republican convention, he was seen as one of three frontrunners, along with banker DeForest Richards and State Senator John McGill of Albany County. However, Governor Richards was ultimately not re-nominated by the Republican Party; instead, DeForest Richards was nominated by acclamation. The Republican platform repudiated its 1894 support for free silver, instead adopting the national Republican platform from the 1896 Republican National Convention in St. Louis.

The Democratic convention occurred as a joint affair with Free Silver Republicans, and the coalition split up the statewide candidates among the two members of the coalition; the Democrats nominated candidates for Governor, Secretary of State, and Treasurer, and Free Silver Republicans chose candidates for State Auditor and Superintendent of Public Instruction. Former State Representative Horace C. Alger was nominated by acclamation.

General election

Results

Results by county

References

1898 Wyoming elections
1898
Wyoming